This is a list of cricket grounds in Pakistan that have been used for first-class, List A and Twenty20 cricket matches.
For grounds used in international cricket, see the map and the notes column.

List of grounds
Grounds listed in bold have hosted at least one international cricket match.

For grounds listed in italics, the name and exact location used for is unknown.

For grounds that share the same NAME, the city the ground is in is listed in brackets to avoid confusion.

See also
 List of stadiums in Pakistan
 List of sports venues in Karachi
 List of sports venues in Lahore
 List of sports venues in Faisalabad

References

External links
 Grounds in Pakistan - CricketArchive

Cricket
Pakistan
Pakistan
Grounds